"Good Woman Blues" is a song written by Ken McDuffie and recorded by American country music artist Mel Tillis.  It was released in September 1976 as the second single from the album Love Revival.  The song was Tillis' second number one on the country chart.  The single stayed at number one for two weeks and spent a total of twelve weeks on the country chart.

Chart performance

References

1976 songs
Mel Tillis songs
1976 singles
MCA Records singles